The Kyoto Shimbun Hai (Japanese 京都新聞杯) is a Japanese Grade 2 flat horse race in Japan for three-year-old Thoroughbreds. It is run over a distance of 2200 metres at Kyoto Racecourse in May.

The Kyoto Shimbun Hai was first run in 1953 and was elevated to Grade 2 status in 1984. It serves as a trial race for the Tokyo Yushun. It was run over a variety of distances in its early history before being contested over 2000 metres from 1966. The distance was increased to 2200 metres in 1984 although it was run over 2000 metres again in 2000 and 2001.

Among the winners of the race have been Katsuragi Ace, Special Week, Admire Vega, Agnes Flight, Heart's Cry and Kizuna.

Winners since 2000 

The 2021 and 2022 runnings took place at Chukyo while Kyoto was closed for redevelopment.

Earlier winners

See also
 Horse racing in Japan
 List of Japanese flat horse races

References

Turf races in Japan